Geraldine McQueen (born 3 February 1976) is a retired Grenadian middle-distance runner. She set the Grenadian national record for the 3000 metres in 1991 at the CARIFTA Games. Geraldine later emigrated to the United States and attended and competed for Martin Luther King High School.

Competition record

References

Living people
Grenadian female middle-distance runners
1976 births